Macrocneme thyra is a moth of the subfamily Arctiinae. It was described by Heinrich Benno Möschler in 1883. It is found in Suriname, Peru, Trinidad, Colombia, Bolivia and [[Pará}, Brazil.

References

Macrocneme
Moths described in 1883